LaTurbo Avedon is an avatar artist, curator, the designer and founder of Panther Modern. Their work emphasizes the practice of nonphysical identity and authorship since 2008–2009. They have explored the growing relationship between users and virtual environments. They create this body of work using the simulation tools of the current moment. The genesis of their identity occurred in various profile creation processes, eventually taking a more rigid form in Second Life.

Their work has appeared internationally including TRANSFER Gallery (New York), transmediale (Berlin), Haus der elektronischen Künste (Basel), The Whitney Museum (New York), HMVK (Dortmund), Barbican Center (London), and Galeries Lafayette (Paris).

In 2020, Avedon created an emoji as part of Unicode 13.0. emoji character library. The new emoji is "Mirror" and is available in Emoji 13.0 for platforms.

LaTurbo Avedon were a resident in The Virtual Factory, Manchester International Festival in July 2020 and in 2016–2017 they were the first virtual resident of the Somerset House Studios in London, exploring nonphysical interaction and studio practices. Their simulated lectures and exhibitions have been hosted internationally, all constructed using game engines and character creation software.

Avedon has worked on commission with the Manchester International Festival (2020), Samsung FRAME (2017), Mapping Festival PARADIGM SHIFT(2017), GIPHY+ Rhizome (2016) and CTM Festival (2015).

Projects

Your Progress Will Be Saved 
This project is the first virtual factory, an online experience created by Avedon who reimagines The Factory within Fortnite Creative, designed by Rem Koolhaas's OMA, Ellen van Loon as lead architect and backed by Manchester City Council, HM Government and Arts Council England.

The factory is a cultural space in Manchester, home to the Manchester International Festival (MIF) 2020.

Panther Modern
In 2013, Avedon founded and designed Panther Modern, a file-based exhibition space built using 3D model files, encouraging artists to create site-specific installations for the internet. The Panther has expanded to seventeen installation rooms, which was created with Cinema4D with a new area being added to the virtual model for each new artist. Since its launch it has hosted works by a variety of New Media and Digital Artists, including Morehshin Allahyari, Claudia Hart, Kim Laughton, and Jonathan Monaghan.

Panther Modern provides a variety of methods to produce works in virtual space, the artist is able to choose the format in which they will share their installations. Completed rooms are added to the existing architecture, allowing the shape of Panther Modern to change with each project.

Club Rothko 
Avedon created a virtual night club called Club Rothko in 2012 that works to intersect the online world and the real world, inspired by night clubs in virtual environments such as Second Life and Mass Effect 2.

The Club Rothko Builder allowed users to make their own 3D sculptures. The most well-known image of Club Rothko is from an interaction with a painting of philosopher Slavoj Žižek.

In 2013, the goal was to fill the virtual place with statues created from selfies emailed to LaTurbo Avedon and then be uploaded to the web and emailed to the submitter in a .zip file.

In 2015, Avedon returned to Club Rothko with a new video "Save 02", that was exhibited at the CICA Museum in Czong, Korea and at the Museum Angewandtekunst, Frankfurt, Germany. This video finds the avatar of the digital artist moving through the virtual disco filled with light projections and producing music on Ableton Live.

Hatsune Miku
Avedon has collaborated on the production of 16-year-old humanoid Hatsune Miku's shows in London and elsewhere.  The initial project "Still Be Here" was commissioned by CTM Festival and debuted at Transmediale in February 2016. Narrative was created by Mari Matsutoya, music by Laurel Halo, character motion by Darren Johnston, produced by Martin Sulzer, visual design and staging by LaTurbo Avedon.

Solo artist 

 Manchester International Festival, “Your Progress Will Be Saved”, 2020
 Offsite Project, “A new screen name changes everything “, 2019
 Webspace Gallery, “Sunset at Mt. Gox”, 2014
 TRANSFER Gallery, “New Sculpt”, 2013
 Gallery Online, “Club Rothko”, 2013

Group exhibitions (selection) 

 Upstream Gallery, “The New outside”, 2020 
 Platform SHAPE, “Transmediale- Future Worlds of Entanglement: Eternity Be Kind+ AIDOL”, 2020
 PAF OLOMOUC Animation and Contemporary Art Festival, Czech Republic, 2019
 Bannister Gallery, Copernicus, 2019
 Arebyte Gallery, Re Figured Ground, Lound, 2018
 Chronus Art Center, Transfer Download, Shanghai, 2017
 The Whitney Museum, Ways of something- Dreamlands, 2016
 Donaufestival, Still be Here, Austria, 2016
 The Wrong Digital Art Biennale, International, 2015 
 CICA Museum, Across Voices, Gimpo, South Korea, 2015
 The 4th Computer Art Congress, Rio de Janeiro, 2014
 The Wrong Biennale, Young internet Based Artists, 2013
 MOMA, PopRally: Abstract Currents, 2013 
 Speed Show: TRANSFER3D, Wroclaw, Poland, 2012

Selected conferences and lectures 

 MINIMUM LABYRINTH - Gray Area Festival, 2020
 No Body But Me - Actor & Avatar Conference - ZHDK Zurich, 2019
 MAKING MY WAY DOWNTOWN - Software for Artists Day 5  – Pioneer Works, 2019
 From Here We Dream Sublime – MediaLive Subterranean, BMoCA – Boulder, 2019
 Remember Me As DLC – ULTRAVIRUS Festival – Sydney, 2018
 Technology and the Occult – Interfaces Monthly/Barbican Centre, London, 2018
 The Real Fake – Conversations at the Edge – School of the Art Institute, 2017
 Nocturnal City: Conversation with Estela Oliva – MUTEK Monreal, 2017

References

Further reading

External links 
 

Virtual avatars